Kian Pirfalak (c. 2013 – November 16, 2022) was an Iranian child who was killed in a shooting by the security forces of Islamic Republic of Iran in his parent's vehicle in the city of Izeh in Iran. His father Meysam Pirfalak was also critically injured in the assault and was hospitalized. His mother and other family members who witnessed the incident blame the attack on Iranian security forces. Islamic Republic news agencies, including IRNA, blamed his death on terrorists, circulating a statement attributed to ISIS, alleging that the group has claimed the deadly shooting that killed him. BBC Monitoring, however, investigated the statement and concluded that it was fake.

Pirfalak’s death sparked a nationwide outrage against the government and its use of extreme lethal force against protestors. He is considered the youngest known victim (either 9 or 10-years old) of suppressing the Mahsa Amini protests.

History 

Kian Pirfalak was shot and killed on November 15, 2022, in the city of Izeh. Seven people died during this incident including two teenagers, Artin Rahmani, and Sepehr Maghsoodi (who was killed by a bullet in his head).

The Islamic Republic News Agency (IRNA), Fars News Agency and other Iranian news outlets attributed the assault to terrorists rather than the state's security forces, attributing the killings to ISIS.  

A relative of Pirfalak told Radio Farda that security agents had opened fire on the car where Pirfalak was sitting. A bullet had gone through Pirfalak's lung. His father was also seriously injured and was later hospitalized. His mother, Zeinab Moulai denies the government's account of events, and claims her son was killed by security forces.

Funeral 
The family placed Pirfalak's body on ice, refusing to keeping it at the morgue. This was due to the fear of security forces stealing the child's body, as that has happened in many cases. Hundreds of people gathered at Pirfalak's funeral and chanted anti-regime slogans in protest of his death.

"Hear it from me about how the shooting happened so they can't say it was by terrorists, because they're lying," Pirfalak's mother Zeinab Molaie told mourners at his funeral. During the ceremony, Pirfalak's mother criticized the Islamic Republic's Supreme Leader Ali Khamenei through a poem, which read: "How's Mister Seyyed Ali [Khamenei] doing? He has a long beard coming down to his chest! A chest full of hatred - his heart is like stone - all he says is nonsense!"

Impact 
Pirfalak's death sparked an increase in the nationwide protests, and international support. After Pirfalak's funeral, Ayatollah Ruhollah Khomeini's childhood home was set on fire on November 17, 2022; which is being used as a commemorative museum and located in the city of Khomeyn. Protests at the University of Tehran's Faculty of Psychology and Educational Sciences displayed photos of Pirfalak.

Days after Pirfalak's death, UNICEF issued a statement condemning the death and detention of children in the wake of the 2022 protests in Iran.

A viral video circulated online of young Pirfalak testing his hand-made boat, and he stated, “in the name of the God of rainbows.” The stanza "In the Name of the Lord of the Rainbow" is a poem by Mahmoud Purohab which is included in Persian 3rd grade elementary school book. As a result, many memorials about Pirfalak have referenced the God of rainbows.

See also 

 Death of Mahsa Amini
 Iranian protests against compulsory hijab
 Deaths during the Mahsa Amini protests

References 

Pirfalak
November 2022 events in Iran
History of the Islamic Republic of Iran
Violence against children
Pirfalak
Political repression in Iran